Kenny Kingston (February 15, 1927 – June 30, 2014) was an American psychic. He described himself as a psychic medium. He is sometimes referred to as a "psychic to the stars" due to his extensive contact with celebrities. Clients for his psychic readings included John Wayne, Harry S. Truman, Dwight D. Eisenhower, Rex Harrison, Lucille Ball, Marilyn Monroe, Whoopi Goldberg and Greta Garbo. Kingston operated a for-profit psychic reading website.

Birth 
Kingston was born in Buffalo, New York on February 15, 1927.

Death 
Kingston died of a cardiovascular disease on June 30, 2014 in Studio City, Los Angeles. He was survived by his partner for 35 years, Valerie Porter.

Works

See also 
 John Holland (psychic)
 Madalyn Aslan
 Gordon Smith (psychic medium)
 Theresa Caputo psychic medium

References

External links 
 
 The Kenny Kingston Psychic Network
 

1927 births
Date of birth unknown
2014 deaths
American psychics